Fusarium patch is a disease in turf grass settings also called pink snow mold or Microdochium patch. In many cool season grass species in North America, it is caused by the fungus Microdochium nivale .  The white-pink mycelium on infected leaf blades is a distinguishing characteristic of the Microdochium nivale pathogen.  Fusarium patch is considered economically important in the turf grass industry because of its tendency to cause significant injury to golf greens, thereby decreasing putting surface quality.  Dissimilar from other snow molds, such as gray snow mold, Microdochium nivale does not need snow cover to cause widespread infection.

Hosts and symptoms
M. nivale can infect all cool-season turf grass species.  Annual bluegrass (Poa annua), perennial ryegrass (Lolium perenne) and creeping bentgrass (Agrostis stolonifera) are more susceptible. In the fall, M.nivale infection begins as small, orange to red-brown spots, circular and only a few centimeters in diameter.  During the winter and into the spring seasons, well-defined, clustered, circular patches 10-20 cm in diameter, of necrotic leaf tissues form on mown turf.  Microdochium nivale is mostly seen on grasses mown at heights of three inches or greater. On taller grass, patches often lack a circular pattern that is seen in shorter mown grass. Pink snow mold patches usually follow drainage patterns since conidia spores are readily dislodged and transported by rainfall and water flowage.  Under prolonged cool and wet conditions, white-pink mycelium can be observed along the circumference of diseased patches.

Disease cycle
M. nivale begins by oversummering (surviving the summer) in thatch or soil as haploid mycelium or spores.  When cool, wet weather arrives in the fall or winter the mycelium grows from  thatch or soil  and infects leaves.  These environmental conditions also favor the development of asexual spores called conidia on conidiophores. These conidia infect leaf sheaths and blades near the soil.  Wind and surface water will help aid in the spread of this disease as it will allow for the spores to contact near by healthy plant. The disease becomes very severe if allowed to spread from the leaf blades to the crown of the plant.  This usually only happens under extreme circumstances, particularly if snowfall covers unfrozen ground.

Environment
Microdochium nivale becomes problematic when turf experiences lengthy periods of cool, wet weather typical of fall or spring and into early summer in the Northern Hemisphere.  The name is somewhat confusing because the presence of snow is not necessary for this pathogen to develop.  The disease can thrive under snow cover, however, if it falls on unfrozen soil with thriving turf.  In general this disease tends to develop proficiently when grass is growing at a slower than normal rate.  Limiting fall nitrogen applications in an attempt to decrease the growth of grass and promote dormancy can help decrease the incidence of Pink Snow Mold.  In regions of high humidity and temperatures ranging between 32 and 46 degrees Fahrenheit or 0 to 8 degrees Celsius, pink snow mold will develop rapidly.

Management
There are a number of different ways to manage diseases including cultural, chemical, and biological controls. Some of these controls are more effective than others, however, the best approach to a managing any disease, including Microdochium Patch, is an integrated approach called Integrated Pest Management or IPM. IPM uses a combination of chemical, cultural and biological controls to reduce spending on pesticides and to decrease pesticide resistance. The following are some of the most important cultural controls used in managing Microdochium Patch.

Cultural controls
Raising the mowing height is an easy way to reduce stress on a turfgrass plant and make the plant less susceptible to attack by disease, but there is a fine line. Managing the moisture available to the plant is another way to help reduce the incidence of disease. The pathogen that causes Microdochium Patch requires and thrives in moist, cool conditions, therefore making sure that you aren't overwatering the turf when conditions are right for infection is very important. Giving the plant only enough water for normal plant function is the best way to ensure disease pressure is reduced as much as possible. Also, starving the turf of moisture can be damaging as this increases susceptibility to infection. Managing the amount of nitrogen available to the plant is another key to decreasing incidence of this disease. Avoiding excess fall nitrogen application will greatly reduce disease pressure of Microdochium nivale. On top of that excess nitrogen available to plant produces rapid growth of above ground tissue. This tissue often has thin cell walls and is prone to attack by disease. Managing thatch and soil drainage are two other important ways of controlling this disease as both of these affect the amount of moisture that is available to create a favorable environment to the disease, giving the plant only enough water for normal plant function is the best way to ensure disease pressure is reduced as much as possible. Despite the fact that the above cultural controls cannot completely control Microdochium Patch, when they are all used to reduce disease pressure, they can have a noticeable impact and will help to reduce the amount of chemical control that is required.

Chemical controls
Chemical controls (i.e. the use of fungicides) to specifically control turf grass diseases have been around since 1891.  Over the years better controls have been developed, all of which tend to be less toxic to animals and the environment when used properly.

There is a wide variety of chemical groups that are labeled for control of Microdochium Patch. They include, but are not limited to the methyl benzimidazole carbamates (MBCs) such as thiophanate methyl, the dicarboximides such as iprodione and vinclozolin, the DMIs such as fenarimol and propiconazole, the QoIs such as azoxystrobin, pyraclostrobin, and trifloxystrobin, the phenylpyrroles such as fludioxonil, certain aromatic hydrocarbons such as PCNB, and the cholronitriles such as chlorothalonil.

These chemical classes should be rotated so that selection pressure on the disease in limited as to avoid resistant strains of this disease. The applicator should read and follow all label rates and directions. Breaking these directions and misuse of any labeled product is breaking the law. Remember that the label is the law. The best way to control Microdochium Patch especially going into winter is to use a three way spray right before the first snow fall. A combination of a dicarboximides such as iprodione, a chloronitrile such as chlorothalonil, and a DMI such as propiconazole will give sufficient control over the span of an average winter.

Importance
Microdochium Patch is a significant problem in the turfgrass management industry. Sports fields, sod farms and home lawns and golf courses can all be damaged by this the disease. The pathogen can be found in the Northern United States and all the way up into Canada, meaning that there is a large area where this pathogen can cause serious disease. The highest incidence of this disease in these areas occurs on golf courses due to the highly managed areas of susceptible turfgrass species such as Creeping Bentgrass (Agrostis stolonifera) and Annual Bluegrass (Poa annua). It is of particular concern because turf on golf courses is considered a high value crop. Diseases such a Microdochium Patch lower the value of the crop by decreasing its aesthetic value, affecting the playability, and decreasing the overall health of the turf. Because golf course budgets are often quite tight, the reduction of fungicide applications required in a season for snow mold will result in more money elsewhere in the budget. Being that the fungicide budget can be 10% of the maintenance budget, reductions in the use of fungicides can cause a significant increase in the amount of money to do other things. On top of that, reducing fungicide inputs helps keep the environment safe and reduces the chances of fungicide resistance development.

See also

 Fusarium
 Fusarium wilt

References

External links
 More Information on Lawn Care and Fusarium Patch
 Additional Information on Microdochium Patch
 Additional Information on Microdochium Patch
 Additional Information on Management of Microdochium Patch
 Additional Information on Microdochium Patch
  Turfgrass disease profile
 Index Fungorum
 USDA ARS Fungal Database

Xylariales
Fungal plant pathogens and diseases
Turfgrass diseases
Fusarium patch

fi:Lumihome